Abdiaziz may refer to:
Abdiaziz District

People
Abdiaziz Abdi, the younger brother of Abdirahman
Abdiaziz Abdinur Ibrahim
Abdiaziz Nur Elmi Koor